The Jardín Etnobotánico de Oaxaca is a botanical garden in Oaxaca City, Mexico. It occupies 2.32 acres of land adjacent to the Church of Santo Domingo. It is administered by the state government of Oaxaca.

References

External links
 

Botanical gardens in Mexico
Cactus gardens
Tourist attractions in Oaxaca
Oaxaca City